Vitja Valenčič (born 12 March 1999) is a Slovenian footballer who plays as a midfielder.

Career

In 2018, Valenčič signed for Olimpija Ljubljana in the Slovenian top flight from Italian Serie A side Fiorentina.

Honours
Olimpija Ljubljana
Slovenian Cup: 2018–19, 2020–21

References

External links
 
 Vitja Valenčič at Soccerway

1999 births
Living people
Footballers from Ljubljana
Slovenian footballers
Association football midfielders
Slovenia youth international footballers
Slovenia under-21 international footballers
Slovenian expatriate footballers
Expatriate footballers in Italy
Slovenian expatriate sportspeople in Italy
ACF Fiorentina players
NK Olimpija Ljubljana (2005) players
Slovenian PrvaLiga players